Hocine Ragued (born  11 February 1983, in Paris) is a former French-born Tunisian footballer.

Club career

Paris Saint-Germain

Ragued started with the youth of Paris FC before joining the PSG academy. After turning pro with the PSG, he was loaned to FC Istres then to FC Gueugnon in Ligue 2 for 6 months, from January 2004 to June 2004. He joined the PSG squad for the 2005/2006 season and got his start on 13 May 2006 against FC Metz.

RAEC Mons

In order to gain play time, Ragued decided to join RAEC Mons in Belgium for a 2-year contract to play in the Belgacom league. He signed an extension until 2011 but decided to resign at the end of the 2008/2009 season.

Slavia Prague

In July 2009, Ragued signed a 4-year contract with SK Slavia Prague. In his first season, he played 23 games in the Czech 1st league and 5 Europa league games and 2 UEFA Champions league pre-round qualifier. SK Slavia Prague ended at the 7th place in the league.

For his second season, Ragued played 12 games and had his last game on 12 November 2010 against Baník Ostrava.

Karabükspor

On 31 January 2011 Ragued signed a 1-year and a half contract with Karabükspor ; he made his debut on 5 February  2011 against Beşiktaş JK. His scored his first goal with his new team during his 4th game against Torku Konyaspor on 27 February. He played a total of 9 games and his team earned the 9th spot of the Süper Lig.

During his second season, Ragued played 24 games.

Espérance de Tunis

Ragued joined the ES Tunis where he became the captain of the team, won 2 championships (2012 and 2014), made it to the finals of the African Champion leagues in 2012. Ragued was voted best player of the team by the ES Tunis fan in 2014 and 2015.

International career

Ragued participated in the Olympics of Athens in 2004. Roger Lemerre gave him his first chance with the A team. Ragued rapidly became a pillar of the national team. He played 2 Africa Cup of Nations (CAN) in 2010 and 2012. He also played in the World Cup 2010 and 2014 qualifying games, in which Tunisia didn't qualify. Ragued has a total of 54 caps with the National team before officially retiring of the National Team on 1 October 2015.

External links
 
 

1983 births
Living people
Tunisian footballers
Paris Saint-Germain F.C. players
FC Istres players
FC Gueugnon players
SK Slavia Prague players
R.A.E.C. Mons players
Kardemir Karabükspor footballers
Emirates Club players
Ligue 1 players
Ligue 2 players
Czech First League players
Süper Lig players
French sportspeople of Tunisian descent
Sportspeople from Saint-Germain-en-Laye
Olympic footballers of Tunisia
Footballers at the 2004 Summer Olympics
Tunisia international footballers
2010 Africa Cup of Nations players
Tunisian expatriate footballers
Expatriate footballers in Belgium
Expatriate footballers in the Czech Republic
Expatriate footballers in Turkey
2012 Africa Cup of Nations players
Espérance Sportive de Tunis players
2015 Africa Cup of Nations players
Association football midfielders
UAE Pro League players
Footballers from Yvelines